Tanya Memme (born June 15, 1971) is a Canadian actress and television presenter best known as the host for Sell This House.

Born in Wainfleet, Ontario, Tanya went to Denis Morris Catholic High School in St. Catharines. In 1993, she was crowned Miss World Canada (part of the Miss World system).

For three seasons/years, since 2012, Tanya has been a regular contributor as a DIY crafter, and 'family member', on the Hallmark Channel's daily show, Home & Family. She has been host of A&E's Sell This House since its debut in 2003. She also hosted Move This House and has been a correspondent for Global TV's Entertainment Tonight Canada. She has made appearances on the television programs JAG, Melrose Place, The Practice, Robotica and CSI: Miami. 
In Los Angeles, she was a co-host of Channel 9's 9 On The Town series in 2004. She appeared in commercials for TVG, the horse racing network, and represented DirecTV in a number of customer education segments. Tanya will co-host the spin-off show Sell This House: Extreme premiering October 29, 2011.

In 2008, Memme was awarded the Best Leading Actress in a Feature Film Under $1 Million Crystal Reel Award by the Florida Motion Picture and Television Association for her starring role in Terror Inside.

Memme has appeared on many talk shows including The View and was interviewed in the documentary Being Canadian. She has been featured in numerous magazine and newspaper articles in the United States and Canada. In 2011, she revealed on Sell This House that she was pregnant with her first child. Tanya gave birth to a baby girl, Ava, in 2011.

References

External links

Official Site

1971 births
Female models from Ontario
Canadian people of Italian descent
Canadian television actresses
Canadian television hosts
Living people
Miss World 1993 delegates
People from the Regional Municipality of Niagara
Canadian women television hosts